Szczytno  is a village in the administrative district of Gmina Choceń, within Włocławek County, Kuyavian-Pomeranian Voivodeship, in north-central Poland. The village has an approximate population of 150.

References

Szczytno